CJ Verdell (born August 16, 1999) is an American football running back who is a free agent. He played college football at Oregon.

Early years
Verdell attended Mater Dei High School in Chula Vista, California. As a senior, he rushed for 2,399 yards on 262 carries with 36 touchdowns. He committed to the University of Oregon to play college football.

College career
Verdell redshirted his first year at Oregon in 2017.

As a Redshirt Freshman, Verdell ran the ball 202 times for 1,018 yards and 10 Touchdowns. He also caught 27 passes for 315 yards and 2 Touchdowns. He returned to Oregon as the starter in 2019 and ran 197 times for 1,220 yards and 8 Touchdowns while collecting 14 receptions for 125 yards. In the 2019 Pac-12 Football Championship Game, he rushed for 208 yards with three touchdowns and was named the game's MVP.

Professional career

Verdell signed with the Indianapolis Colts as an undrafted free agent on May 13, 2022. He was waived on August 23, 2022.

References

External links
Oregon Ducks bio

1999 births
Living people
Sportspeople from Chula Vista, California
Players of American football from California
American football running backs
Oregon Ducks football players
Indianapolis Colts players